Mohammed Thomas David "Moe" Elewonibi (born December 16, 1965) is a Nigerian-Canadian former offensive lineman who played in the National Football League (NFL) and the Canadian Football League (CFL). He was injured just prior to the end of the first half of the Eagles / Cowboys Divisional Playoff Game on January 7, 1996 and transported off the field on a stretcher with a knee injury. It was his final game in the NFL.

Early years
Elewonibi was born in Lagos, Nigeria and raised in Victoria, British Columbia. He attended Victoria High School, where he excelled at soccer and basketball.

Elewonibi played two years for the Okanagan Sun football club, and was named to the 25 Year All Time Team announced in 2005 to celebrate 25th anniversary of the sun organization.

College career
He began his college career at Snow College, in Ephraim, UT, where he first began to play football. He transferred to Brigham Young University to finish his college career. Mo won the Outland Trophy while at Brigham Young. The award is for the country’s most outstanding lineman in college football.

Personal
Elewonibi converted from Islam to the Church of Jesus Christ of Latter-day Saints during his second year of college. Elewonibi now lives on Vancouver Island and works as a counselor helping recovering addicts return to normal life.

References

External links
Just Sports Stats
Outland Trophy Winner
Bio
News article

1965 births
Living people
All-American college football players
American football offensive tackles
Barcelona Dragons players
BC Lions players
BYU Cougars football players
Canadian players of American football
Canadian football offensive linemen
Nigerian emigrants to Canada
Nigerian players of American football
Philadelphia Eagles players
Sportspeople from Lagos
Sportspeople from Victoria, British Columbia
Washington Redskins players
Winnipeg Blue Bombers players
Canadian Latter Day Saints
Canadian former Muslims
Black Mormons
Converts to Mormonism
Snow Badgers football players